Ian or Iain Campbell may refer to:

Music
Ian Campbell (folk musician) (1933–2012), one of the leaders of the British folk revival of the 1960s
Ian Campbell Folk Group, the group led by Ian Campbell, which included Dave Pegg and Dave Swarbrick, later of Fairport Convention
Ian Campbell (opera director) (born 1945), Australian-born opera singer, stage director and administrator
Ian Campbell (rapper) (born 1965), English hip-house/eurodance rapper
Ian Campbell, singer with Neuraxis

Politicians 
Ian Campbell (Scottish politician) (1926–2007), Labour MP for Dunbartonshire West 1970–1987
Ian Campbell (Australian politician) (born 1959), Australian politician
Ian Campbell (Canadian politician) (born 1974 or 1975), Canadian politician
Ian Campbell (public servant) (21st century), Australian public servant

Sports
Ian Campbell (rugby union) (1928–2022), Chilean rugby union footballer, of Scottish descent
Iain Campbell (footballer) (born 1985), Scottish footballer
Ian Campbell (triple jumper) (born 1957), Australian long and triple jumper 
Iain Campbell (cricketer) (1928–2015), English cricketer and headmaster
Ian Campbell (Middlesex cricketer) (1870–1954), English cricketer
Ian Campbell (Queen's Park footballer) (fl. 1965–1977), Scottish football player (Queen's Park FC)
Ian Campbell (footballer, born 1953), Scottish football player and manager (Brechin City FC)
Ian Campbell (American football) (born 1985), Kansas State Wildcats college football player
Iain Campbell (swimmer) (born 1965), British swimmer

Others
Ian Campbell (Royal Navy officer) (1898–1980), British admiral
Ian Ross Campbell (1900–1997), Australian soldier and businessman
Ian Campbell, 11th Duke of Argyll (1903–1973), Scottish peer
Ian MacDonald Campbell (1922–1994), British civil engineer
Ian James Campbell (1931–1963), murdered Los Angeles, California police officer
Ian Campbell, 12th Duke of Argyll (1937–2001), Scottish Peer and Chief of Clan Campbell
Iain Donald Campbell (1941–2014), Scottish biophysicist
Ian Campbell (apothecary) (active circa 1992–2007), former officer of the British Medical Household
Iain D. Campbell (1963–2017), minister in the Free Church of Scotland
Ian L. Campbell (born 1945), British historian specialising in Ethiopia

See also
Iain Campbell Smith (active since 1997), Australian diplomat, singer/songwriter and comedian